Xenotenes is a genus of moths belonging to the subfamily Tortricinae of the family Tortricidae.

Species
Xenotenes micrastra Diakonoff, 1954

See also
List of Tortricidae genera

References

External links
Tortricid.net

Tortricidae genera